Count Basie Swings, Joe Williams Sings is an album by pianist/bandleader Count Basie and vocalist Joe Williams recorded in 1955 and originally released on the Clef label.

Reception

AllMusic awarded the album 5 stars stating "Joe Williams' debut as the featured vocalist in Count Basie's band was one of those landmark moments that even savvy observers don't fully appreciate when it occurs, then realize years later how momentous an event they witnessed. Williams brought a different presence to the great Basie orchestra than the one Jimmy Rushing provided; he couldn't shout like Rushing, but he was more effective on romantic and sentimental material, while he was almost as spectacular on surging blues, up-tempo wailers, and stomping standards".

Track listing
 "Every Day I Have the Blues" (Peter Chapman, Mayall York) – 5:29
 "The Come Back" (Memphis Slim) – 5:28
 "Alright, Okay, You Win" (Sidney Wyche) – 3:05
 "In the Evening (When the Sun Goes Down)" (Leroy Carr, Don Raye) – 3:38
 "Roll 'Em Pete" (Pete Johnson, Big Joe Turner) – 3:12
 "Teach Me Tonight" (Sammy Cahn, Gene DePaul) – 3:04
 "My Baby Upsets Me" (Joe Williams) – 2:58
 "Please Send Me Someone to Love" (Percy Mayfield) – 3:33
 "Ev'ry Day" (Sammy Fain, Irving Kahal) – 3:48
 "As Long as I Love You" (Bernie Moten, Henri Woode) – 3:06 Bonus track on CD reissue
 "Stop! Don't!" (George Ronald Brown) – 2:36 Bonus track on CD reissue
 "Too Close for Comfort" (Jerry Bock, Larry Holofcener, George David Weiss) – 2:53 Bonus track on CD reissue
Recorded at Fine Sound in New York City on May 17, 1955 (tracks 1–4), July 26, 1955 (tracks 5–9), June 27, 1956 (track 12) and at Universal Recording Corp, Chicago on January 23, 1956 (tracks 10 & 11)

Personnel 
 Joe Williams - vocals
Count Basie - piano
Wendell Culley, Reunald Jones, Thad Jones, Joe Newman - trumpet
Henry Coker, Bill Hughes, Benny Powell - trombone 
Marshall Royal - alto saxophone, clarinet 
Bill Graham - alto saxophone
Frank Wess - alto saxophone, tenor saxophone, flute 
Frank Foster - tenor saxophone
Charlie Fowlkes - baritone saxophone, bass clarinet 
Freddie Green - guitar 
Eddie Jones - bass
Sonny Payne - drums
Frank Foster (tracks 2–9), Ernie Wilkins (tracks 1 & 6) - arranger

References 

1955 albums
Count Basie Orchestra albums
Joe Williams (jazz singer) albums
Clef Records albums
Verve Records albums
Albums arranged by Ernie Wilkins
Albums arranged by Frank Foster (musician)
Albums produced by Norman Granz